The Philippines men's national basketball team won the bronze medal at the 1954 FIBA World Championship held in Brazil. Since the 2014, the event is known as the FIBA Basketball World Cup. This is also the Philippines' first appearance in the tournament.

To date, the Philippines' performance in the tournament is the best finish by an Asian country in the FIBA Basketball World Cup. The 1950s is often regarded as a "golden era" in Philippine basketball, with the Philippine team's feat in the 1954 championship a factor which contributed to the contemporary popularity of basketball in the country. The 1954 squad is also an inductee of the Philippine Sports Hall of Fame of the Philippine Sports Commission.

Roster
The Philippine squad for the 1954 FIBA World Championship consisted of 12 players. The roster was led by Lauro Mumar and Carlos Loyzaga, the latter being named to the 1954 World Championship's All-Tournament Team. 

The team had six players who had previously competed in the Summer Olympics: Loyzaga, Florentino Bautista, Antonio Genato, Ponciano Saldaña, and Mariano Tolentino (1952 Helsinki) and team captain Mumar (1948 London). Some of the players had plied their trade in the Manila Industrial and Commercial Athletic Association (MICAA) or were part of collegiate teams playing in the National Collegiate Athletic Association (NCAA) and the University Athletic Association of the Philippines (UAAP).

The team was led by head coach Herminio Silva. The squad was formed from a 24-man pool of players. The initial candidates were determined by a special basketball committee. The final squad formed by Silva is mostly same as the Philippine team which participated in the 1954 Asian Games. Asian Games captain Rafael Hechanova begged off having been recently married at the time. Jose Maria Cacho, Eduardo Lim and Ignacio Ramos also forego from participating in the 1954 championship. Mumar was named skipper in Hechanova's stead, while Rafael Barredo and Ben Francisco were named to the roster. Francis Wilson and Alfredo Sagarbarria were named alternates.

Former basketball player and government official Ambrosio Padilla also headed the 1954 squad.

Preliminary round
The Philippines was drawn to Group A with Paraguay men's national basketball team and host Brazil in the preliminary round. The Philippines won over Paraguay despite trailing in the first half. Brazil defeated the Philippines but the host's win over Paraguay ensured that the Philippines progress to the final round.

Final round
All teams play one game against each other for a total of seven games. The teams with the best records are awarded medals.

The Philippines were tasked to face tournament favorites United States and expectedly lost to them. This was followed by wins over Israel, Formosa, Canada and a second lost to host Brazil. 

The Philippines were assured of a bronze medal after their 66–60 win over France. This is due to Uruguay, their final opponent, having an inferior win–loss record. Nevertheless, the Philippines capped their campaign with a victory over Uruguay to formalize their third place finish.

References

1954 team
1954 in Philippine basketball